A pantograph is a commonly used overhead suspension system for lamps and audio and video monitors in television studios. It is also used on a smaller scale in many photography studios. Using either motor driven cables or a spring system, the pantograph can be balanced so that a light touch can readjust the height of the load (usually a lamp). The system usually works through a series of connected diagonals that can be compressed or extended to adjust the height of the rig.

External links 
 Doughty Pantographs
 IFF manual pole operated pantograph
 IFF manual operated friction pantographs
 IFF motorized pantograph
 Bowens Website Goto to "Accessories", then "Overhead/Pantograph" section (website doesn't allow direct links)

Stage lighting